The Pititsa hill climb is an automobile hillclimbing competition which occurs in the village of Pititsa, about 15 km northeast of Patras in Achaea regional unit, Greece.

It began in 1973 with the champion named Leonidas who drove a Porsche Carrera RSR; the length was then 3.8 km. The Pititsa hill climb is a competition of the Greek Hill Climb Championship; it is the oldest and the most historic event along with the Ritsona hill climb in Ritsona. For many years two championship events were held in the track near Pititsa. In 1998 there were some problems with the road, so the hill climb moved to Omplos until 2007, when it returned again to Pititsa.

Winners (best time)

Sources
 The first version of this article has been based in the text of :el:Ανάβαση Πιτίτσας of the Greek Wikipedia published under GFDL.

References

Hillclimbs
Motorsport competitions in Greece
Achaea
Rio, Greece